Gorodishchi is an urban-type settlement in Petushinsky District of Vladimir Oblast, Russia. Population:

References

Notes

Sources

Urban-type settlements in Vladimir Oblast